Perl Object-Oriented Persistence (POOP) is the term given to refer to object-relational mapping mechanisms written in the Perl programming language to provide object persistence. Dave Rolsky divides POOP mechanisms into two categories:

 RDBMS-OO Mappers: These tools attempt to map RDBMS data structures (tables, columns, rows) onto Perl objects.
 OO-Persistence Tools: These tools attempt to map Perl objects into an arbitrary format, often an RDBMS.

External links

 Perl Object-Oriented Persistence Web Site
 SLOOPS - Simple , Light OO Persistence System

Perl